Kulamani Samal is an Indian politician and professionally a Medical Practitioner and Social Worker. He educated M.B.B.S. at S.C.B. Medical College, Cuttack (Odisha). He is elected to the 16th Lok Sabha in 2014 from Jagatsinghpur constituency in Odisha.
He is a member of the Biju Janata Dal (BJD) political party.

See also
 Indian general election, 2014 (Odisha)

References

Living people
Lok Sabha members from Odisha
India MPs 2014–2019
People from Jagatsinghpur district
Year of birth missing (living people)
Biju Janata Dal politicians